Rhopobota eclipticodes is a species of moth of the family Tortricidae. It is found in China (Zhejiang, Hubei, Guizhou).

The wingspan is 12–14 mm. The ground color of the forewings is grey. The hindwings are grey.

References

Moths described in 1935
Eucosmini